Ovsyanka is a village in Krasnoyarsk Krai. The population at the 2010 census was 2228.

Geography
Ovsyanka lies along the Yenisei River and is surrounded by forests.

References

Cities and towns in Krasnoyarsk Krai
Yeniseysk Governorate
Populated places on the Yenisei River